is a Japanese dark fantasy manga series written and illustrated by Sui Ishida. It was serialized in Shueisha's seinen manga magazine Weekly Young Jump from September 2011 to September 2014, and was collected in fourteen tankōbon volumes. A prequel, titled Tokyo Ghoul [Jack], ran online on Jump Live in 2013 and was collected in a single tankōbon volume. A sequel, titled Tokyo Ghoul:re, was serialized in Weekly Young Jump from October 2014 to July 2018, and was collected in sixteen tankōbon volumes. The story is set in a world where vicious species, known as ghouls, creatures that look like normal people but can only survive by eating human flesh, live among the human population in secrecy.

A 12-episode anime television series adaptation produced by Pierrot, aired on Tokyo MX from July to September 2014. A 12-episode second season, titled Tokyo Ghoul √A (pronounced Tokyo Ghoul Root A), which follows an original story, aired from January to March 2015. A live-action film based on the manga was released in Japan in July 2017, with a sequel being released in July 2019. An anime adaptation based on the sequel manga, Tokyo Ghoul:re, aired for two seasons; the first from April to June 2018, and the second from October to December 2018. In North America, Viz Media licensed the manga for an English release, while Funimation licensed the anime series for streaming and home video distribution.

As of January 2021, Tokyo Ghoul had over 47 million copies in circulation worldwide, making it one of the best-selling manga series of all time.

Synopsis

Setting
Tokyo Ghoul is set in an alternate reality where ghouls, creatures that look like normal people but can only survive by eating human flesh, live among the human population in secrecy, hiding their true nature in order to evade pursuit from the authorities. Ghouls have powers including enhanced strength and regenerative abilities - a regular ghoul produces 4–7 times more kinetic energy in their muscles than a normal human; they also have several times the RC cells, a cell that flows like blood and can become solid instantly. Another distinctive trait of ghouls is that when they are excited or hungry, the color of their sclera in both eyes turns black and their irises red.

A half-ghoul can either be born naturally as a ghoul and a human's offspring, or artificially created by transplanting some ghoul organs into a human. In both cases, a half-ghoul is usually much stronger than a pure-blood ghoul. In the case of a half-ghoul, only one of the eyes undergoes the "red eye" transformation. Natural born half-ghouls are very rare, and creating half-ghouls artificially initially has a low success rate. There is also the case of half-humans, hybrids of ghouls and humans that can feed like normal humans and lack a Kagune while possessing enhanced abilities, like increased speed and reaction speed, but shortened lifespans. Naturally born half-ghouls can also eat like normal humans or full ghouls.

Plot

The story follows Ken Kaneki, a student who barely survives a deadly encounter with Rize Kamishiro, his date who reveals herself as a ghoul and tries to eat him. He is taken to the hospital in critical condition. After recovering, Kaneki discovers that he underwent a surgery that transformed him into a half-ghoul. This was accomplished because some of Rize's organs were transferred into his body, and now, like normal ghouls, he must consume human flesh to survive.  Ghouls who run a coffee shop called   "Anteiku" (あんていく) take him in and teach him to deal with his new life as a half-ghoul. Some of his daily struggles include fitting into the ghoul society, as well as keeping his identity hidden from his human companions, especially from his best friend, Hideyoshi Nagachika.

The prequel series Tokyo Ghoul [Jack] follows the youths of Kishō Arima and Taishi Fura, two characters from the main series who become acquainted when they join forces to investigate the death of Taishi's friend at the hands of a ghoul, leading to Taishi eventually following Arima's path and joining the CCG (Commission of Counter Ghoul), the federal agency tasked into dealing with crimes related to ghouls as well.

The sequel series Tokyo Ghoul:re follows an amnesiac Kaneki under the new identity of Haise Sasaki (the result of horrific brain damage sustained from Kishō Arima). He is the mentor of a special team of CCG investigators called "Quinx Squad" that underwent a similar procedure as his, allowing them to obtain the special abilities of Ghouls in order to fight them but still being able to live as normal humans.

Media

Manga

Tokyo Ghoul is written and illustrated by Sui Ishida. It began serialization in 2011's 41st issue of the seinen manga magazine Weekly Young Jump, published by Shueisha on September 8, 2011, and the final chapter appeared in 2014's 42nd issue, released on September 18, 2014. The series has been collected in fourteen tankōbon volumes, released under Shueisha's Young Jump Comics imprint between February 17, 2012, and October 17, 2014. The series has been licensed for an English release by Viz Media and the first volume was released on June 16, 2015.

In 2013, a prequel spin-off manga titled Tokyo Ghoul [Jack] was released on Jump Live digital manga. The story spans 7 chapters and focuses on Arima Kishō and Taishi Fura 12 years before the events of Tokyo Ghoul. The manga features several characters from the main series including the above stated Kishō Arima, Taishi Fura, and future key characters Itsuki Marude and Yakumo "Yamori" Ōmori. It was compiled into a tankōbon volume published digitally by Shueisha on October 18, 2013.

On October 17, 2014, a full-color illustration book known as Tokyo Ghoul Zakki was released along with the 14th and final volume of the manga. Zakki includes all promotional images, Volume covers and unreleased concept art with commentary by the creator Sui Ishida.

A sequel titled Tokyo Ghoul:re began serialization in 2014's 46th issue of Weekly Young Jump, published on October 16, 2014. The series is set 2 years after the end of the original series and introduces a new set of characters. This series was concluded on July 19, 2018, with Volume 16.

Light novels
Four light novels have been released thus far and all are written by Shin Towada, with illustrations done by series creator Sui Ishida. On June 19, 2013,  was released, Illustrations were done by the series creator Sui Ishida and written by Shin Towada and serves as sidestory/spin off that focuses on the daily lives of characters from the Tokyo Ghoul series.  was released on June 19, 2014, and fills in the 6 month time gap between volumes 8 and 9 of the first series.

The third novel  was released on December 19, 2014. Past takes place before the events of the main series and focuses on the further backstory of certain Tokyo Ghoul characters, including Touka Kirishima, Ayato Kirishima, and series protagonist Ken Kaneki. The fourth novel,  was released on December 19, 2016. It takes place during the events of Tokyo Ghoul :re, focusing on the Quinx, CCG, and other characters.

Anime

A 12-episode anime television series adaptation by Pierrot aired on Tokyo MX between July 4 and September 19, 2014. It also aired on TV Aichi, TVQ, TVO, AT-X, and Dlife. Funimation has licensed the anime series in North America. A second season, titled Tokyo Ghoul √A (read as "Root A"), aired in Japan between January 9 and March 27, 2015. "Glassy Sky" ("Glassy sky above, As long as I'm alive, you will be a part of me") is an insert song in this season, which is a first English song written by Yutaka Yamada in Tokyo Ghoul. On March 10, 2017, it was announced that the anime will premiere on Adult Swim's Saturday late-night action programming block, Toonami starting on March 25. Madman Entertainment announced that they had licensed the series in Australia and New Zealand, and simulcasted it on AnimeLab. Anime Limited licensed the series in the UK and Ireland, and later announced during MCM London Comic-Con that the series will be broadcast on Viceland UK.

An anime adaptation for Tokyo Ghoul:re was announced on October 5, 2017, and started airing on April 3, 2018. Toshinori Watanabe replaced Shuhei Morita as the director, while Chūji Mikasano returned to write scripts. Pierrot produced the animation, while Pierrot+ is credited for animation assistance. Atsuko Nakajima replaced Kazuhiro Miwa as the character designer. The opening theme of the first season is "Asphyxia" by Cö shu Nie and the ending theme is "Half" by Queen Bee. The series aired in two seasons, with the first 12 episodes airing from April 3 to June 19, 2018, and the second season airing from October 9 to December 25, 2018.

Video games
A video game titled Tokyo Ghoul: Carnaval ∫ Color by Bandai Namco Games was released in Japan for Android smartphones on February 6, 2015, and on February 9 for iOS. The player builds a team from a number of ghoul and investigator characters and explores a 3D map. Another video game titled Tokyo Ghoul: Jail for the PlayStation Vita console was released on October 1, 2015. It is set to introduce a new protagonist by the name of Rio, who will interact with characters from the manga/anime. The game was developed by Bandai Namco Games as well and is categorized as an adventure RPG where players will be able to explore Tokyo's 23 wards. The mobile game Tokyo Ghoul: Dark War focuses on the conflict between ghouls and the CCG that terrorizes the city of Tokyo. In the June 2018 edition of V-Jump it was revealed that a new game, titled Tokyo Ghoul: re Call to Exist, was released in 2019.

Live-action films

A live-action film based on the manga was released in Japan on July 29, 2017. Kentarō Hagiwara directed the film. The cast included Masataka Kubota for the role of protagonist Ken Kaneki and Fumika Shimizu for the role of Touka Kirishima. Yū Aoi was cast as Rize Kamishiro, Nobuyuki Suzuki played Kotaro Amon and Yo Oizumi played Kureo Mado. A sequel film titled Tokyo Ghoul S was released in Japan on July 19, 2019, with Maika Yamamoto replacing Fumika Shimizu as Touka Kirishima, and Shota Matsuda joining the cast as Shuu Tsukiyama.

Reception
Tokyo Ghoul was nominated for the 38th Kodansha Manga Award in 2014. Tokyo Ghoul was chosen as one of the Best Manga at the Comic-Con International Best & Worst Manga of 2016. The Young Adult Library Services Association in the United States named the series one of its "Great Graphic Novels for Teens" and "Popular Paperbacks for Young Adults" in 2017. In 2018, it was nominated for the 30th Harvey Award for Best Manga. On TV Asahi's Manga Sōsenkyo 2021 poll, in which 150.000 people voted for their top 100 manga series, Tokyo Ghoul ranked 41st.

Tokyo Ghoul was the 27th best-selling manga series in Japan in 2013, with 1.6 million estimated sales. As of January 2014, the manga had sold around 2.6 million copies. It was the fourth best-selling manga series in Japan in 2014, with 6.9 million copies sold. The whole original series sold over 12 million copies. The sequel series, Tokyo Ghoul:re sold over 3.7 million copies in Japan during its debut year in 2015, and 4.3 million copies in 2016. It was the fifth best-selling manga series in 2017 with sales of over 5.3 million copies. It was the tenth best-selling manga series in 2018 with 3.2 million copies sold. Both series combined for over 24 million copies in circulation by June 2017, and they had 34 million copies in print worldwide as of January 2018. As of July 2018, both manga had 37 million in print. From December 2017 to December 2018, the franchise sold 2.3 billion yen, and was ranked at 16th place as one of the top-selling media franchises in Japan. As of March 3, 2019, both manga had 44 million copies in print. As of January 21, 2021, both manga had over 47 million copies in print.

On June 12, 2015, the Chinese Ministry of Culture  listed Tokyo Ghoul √A among 38 anime and manga titles banned in China. In February 2021, it was reported that the series, along with Death Note and Inuyashiki, was banned from distribution on two unspecified websites in Russia. However, the Tokyo Ghoul series became unavailable for Russian audiences from March 2022 after Russia invaded its neighboring Ukraine. As a result, Sony, who distributes the series via Crunchyroll, has closed down its Wakanim and Crunchyroll EMEA services in the country, in line with global sanctions and boycotts.

Notes

References

External links
  official manga website at Weekly Young Jump 
  
 
 

 
2011 manga
2013 manga
2014 anime television series debuts
2014 manga
2015 anime OVAs
2015 anime television series debuts
2018 anime television series debuts
Anime series based on manga
Cannibalism in fiction
Censored television series
Comics set in Tokyo
Crunchyroll anime
Dark fantasy anime and manga
Jump J-Books
Manga adapted into films
Manga adapted into television series
Mass media franchises
Medialink
Pierrot (company)
Seinen manga
Shueisha manga
Supernatural thriller anime and manga
Television censorship in China
Toonami
Tokyo MX original programming
Urban fantasy anime and manga 
Viz Media manga
Viz Media novels
Works banned in China
Works banned in Russia